Saint-Avit-de-Tardes is a commune in the Creuse department in central France.

Geography
The village lies on the left bank of the Tardes, which flows west through the southern part of the commune, then north through its western part.

Population

See also
Communes of the Creuse department

References

Communes of Creuse